Kalimantsia is an extinct chalicothere from the Miocene of Bulgaria, Europe. It contains one species, K. bulgarica.

Description
Kalimantsia is named for the area in which it was discovered in 2001 by Geraads, Spassov, and Kovachev. The habitat would have been quite open and the remains of Kalimantsia are accompanied by those of horses, early deer, and various carnivorous mammals. Kalimantsia has a shorter muzzle than the horse-like shapes of the rest of the chalicotheres. It also has a domed head that would have resembled those of pachycephalosaurs. It is believed that males often competed by butting their heads together. The teeth of Kalimantsia are long and low, and well adapted for eating leaves.

Size
 3 m (10 ft.)

Lifestyle
 Browser

See also

Tylocephalonyx - Another genus of chalicothere that also has a domed head.

References

Chalicotheres
Miocene odd-toed ungulates
Miocene mammals of Europe
Prehistoric monotypic mammal genera
Fossil taxa described in 2001